Half Way There... Pt. 1 is a commercial mixtape by rapper Snow Tha Product. It was released on June 17, 2016.

Track listing

Charts

References

Hip hop EPs
Atlantic Records EPs